Sakamoto Days (stylized in all caps) is a Japanese manga series written and illustrated by Yuto Suzuki. It began serialization in Shueisha's Weekly Shōnen Jump in November 2020. It is simultaneously published in English by Viz Media and the Manga Plus online platform.

Plot
Taro Sakamoto used to be an unrivaled hitman, earning legendary status in the underworld. But one day, the unthinkable happened. Sakamoto fell in love. He started dating, retired, got married, and had a kid, growing overweight as a result. Though now working as a humble convenience store owner, the world of hitmen still follows him. Sakamoto, along with Shin, a young man with telepathy and employee at his small store, will protect his humble life and family, or die trying.

Characters

Sakamoto's Convenience Store

An ex-hitman who gave up a life of wealth and crime to marry Aoi. He has gained a lot of weight, and has become more laid-back, but still has his superhuman skill and strength from his hitman days. During extreme situations, he loses all this fat, and becomes skinny, becoming twice as powerful as before.

A former hitman who admires Sakamoto, and now works for him at his convenience store. He is known as Shin the Clairvoyant because he has the ability to read minds. A running gag is Sakamoto imagining killing him when he annoys him.

The daughter of a Chinese mob boss. She is airheaded, but can be analytical and competent when necessary. While she does not do much fighting, she is very capable, as she uses a fighting style that mixes Tai Chi with Drunken Fist.

The wife of Sakamoto. She loves her husband very much, despite his history as a hitman. She's also the reason of how Sakamoto abandons killing and shows him a better path to protecting his loved ones.

The daughter of Sakamoto and Aoi. 

A hitman who specializes in sniping. He is very gullible and hyperemotional, but his skills with a sniper rifle easily make up for it, even holding the all-time record at the JCC (anonymously, due to simply forgetting to write his name). After his encounter and encouragement from Sakamoto, he becomes a regular in his shop, and sometimes his scout.

The Order

Sakamoto's classmate in the JCC who would serve as an Order member with Sakamoto until his retirement. He is very cheerful and casual, which bely his skill, and he enjoys antagonizing his fellow Order members. He locates Sakamoto after he gains a bounty and does what he can to maintain Sakamoto's peaceful life while still serving as an Order member. His weapon of choice is a multipurpose tool with various types of blades, and is also highly skilled at disguising himself as other people.

A member of the Order. He is cynical, strict, and hates onions with a murderous passion, but cares deeply for his fellow Order members, especially his mentee Osaragi. His highly professional nature often clashes with his peers' casual attitudes. His weapon of choice is a hammer.

A member of the Order who only recently joined. Shishiba serves as a sort of mentor to her. She is childish, mischievous, often fretful, and rather gullible, but ruthless as a killer. She has a great love for food, especially snacks. Her weapon of choice is a large circular saw.

A member of the Order. He is harsh and highly intimidating, but cares for the safety of others above all else; Nagumo enjoys antagonizing him due to this tsundere nature. He has incredible physical strength.

A legendary, almost mythical member of the Order. He is elderly, seems to always be half-asleep, and constantly murmurs inaudibly under his breath, but is terrifyingly strong, able to slice through nearly anything. His weapon of choice is a katana.

A member of the Order who secretly works for X. He is an eccentric movie director famous for movies about assassins; his passion is so great he will unhesitatingly kill anyone who insults movies. He has no particular loyalty towards X, only following him so he may create a movie about a battle between X and the JAA, with no care as to who wins. His weapon of choice is a bladed clapperboard and a heat-ray camera, which he also uses to help visualize his fighting as action choreography.

JCC

A very timid and anxious girl who befriends Sakamoto during the JCC entrance exam. She is good at housework, adverse to violence, and seemingly has no instincts as an assassin, but in truth, has great speed and reflexes, and seems to visualize a "path" she can follow to kill an opponent. She is the niece of Rion Akao, who apparently also saw the "path". She joins the JCC for information on Rion's whereabouts, and joins with Sakamoto, Shin, and Natsuki to locate the student database.

A sarcastic, dry, and rather blunt student in the research department who temporarily worked for Kashima as an enforcer. He is the older brother of Mafuyu. Natsuki is known amongst his peers as a prodigious weapons maker, and has created countless inventions and prototypes of varying success. He and Shin get on each other's nerves, but work surprisingly well together, and ally to locate the student database. Natsuki's fighting skills are only average, but he utilizes a suit he created that grants invisibility to anything it covers, making him a tricky opponent.

A germaphobic, easily-agitated 14-year-old boy who aspires to be an assassin and participates in the JCC entrance exam. Despite his age, he is highly skilled and ruthless, remaining calm during battle. He is the younger brother of Natsuki. His weapons of choice are blades built into his boots, as he hates getting his hands dirty.

A cheery girl who is an obsessive fan of Sakamoto and participates in the JCC entrance exam. Her obsession is so great, she even views Sakamoto as a godlike figure, and targets Shin when she realizes he admires Sakamoto as well, though not realizing their connection. Her weapon of choice is a gun/axe hybrid.

An incredibly shy boy who participates in the JCC entrance exam. He has highly sensitive hearing, able to pick out distinct, faint sounds even amongst static.

 An impassive and cynical student in the assassination department. Despite his outwardly cold personality, he is rather sincere, willing to apologize when he is mistaken, and gets along very well with his peers. He is the son of Yotsumura, who he loathes for killing his mother. Amane collaborates with Uzuki to bring down the JAA and have the opportunity to kill Yotsumura, but turns against him when his fellow students are caught in the conflict. His weapon of choice is a bladed, four-sectioned staff, and is also highly perceptive.

 The janitor at the JCC, Yotsumura's father-in-law, and Amane's grandfather. Unlike Amane, he does not desire revenge against Yotsumura, and is very close with Amane and cares for Amane's well-being. He is a capable assassin, but his greatest asset is his superhuman memory, able to remember every detail about every student who attended the JCC after him, earning him the nickname "Database".

 More often referred to simply as "Satoda-sensei". Along with her longtime friend and classmate Byodo, she has been at the JCC the longest as an instructor, even teaching during Sakamoto's time there. Though Satoda is skilled enough to earn an invitation to join the Order, she turned it down, deciding that fostering and protecting her students is more important. Though retired, she is an aikido master, specializing in redirecting and nullifying attacks.

 An incredibly skilled assassin and a classmate of Sakamoto in the JCC, along with Nagumo. She seems to have the unique ability to see "paths" to follow to kill opponents, something her niece Akira can do as well. She has been reported to have been eliminated by Uzuki.
Jay Erk/Kill Baby
An overconfident man who participates in the JCC entrance exam, despite the fact that he has failed the same exam four times prior. He is teamed up with Sakamoto and Akira during the exam and seems to pass every challenge with simply good luck.

X's Gang
 / X
The main antagonist of the series. Also known as Slur. A serial killer who is hunting assassins and seeks to overthrow the JAA, desiring to kill only those he considers evil for the sake of a better society. This doctrine has earned him many admirers in the assassin world, who treat him as an almost religious figure. He is cold and determined when trying to accomplish his mission, but very caring and friendly towards his subordinates. He has met Sakamoto in the past, who is the only one who has injured him.

A cyborg who works for X. He often wears a reindeer mask to cover his heavily stitched face. He is cruel and ruthless, and believes his killing is justified under X's doctrine. He utilizes the various weaponry installed inside his body, such as several blades and guns to fight.

An incredibly skilled member of X's crew. He is highly lackadaisical towards everything, even killing. A very relaxed man, he is often seen sleeping or playing video games when he is not in combat. His weapon of choice is a mace with a blaster built into the head.

A playful masochist who believes being close to death is when people are most human, and constantly seeks to have himself tortured for this experience. He is a skilled hypnotist, who triggers commands through clapping, and his weapon of choice is a crescent-shaped blade on a chain.

A very harsh man whom Club Jam refers to as his older brother. True to his name, he loves to eat spicy peppers, but appears to not be able to handle the spice.

Other characters

 A member of the same Triad Lu Xioatang formerly belonged to. He is a weak fighter, but is vastly intelligent and a master strategist, which he has used alone to rise through the Triad ranks. This rather passive approach has drawn the disapproval of other members. Wutang grew up with Lu, who he has a massive crush on due to being the only person to ever encourage Wutang. Though he initially seeks to take Lu back to the Triad, Wutang relents upon seeing her happiness and Sakamoto's skill, and becomes an ally.

 The head of the lab that raised Shin, and his foster father. A scientist who struggles to bring his wild science to fruition, Shin accidentally drank one of Asakura's serums, granting him his mind-reading abilities. Shin grew annoyed that Asakura seemed to worried about his well-being more than the fact that his science worked, and ran away from the lab long ago. Despite his apparent coldness towards Asakura, Shin cares about him and respects Asakura for raising him, even using Asakura's name as his own surname.

Other antagonists

 A serial killer from death row. She kills those she loves to maintain their attention forevermore. Her weapons of choice are spikes that shoot out from her body.

A serial killer from death row. He kills to provide people with a satisfying ending to their lives. His weapon of choice is an axe tied to a rope.

A serial killer from death row. He kills to "see inside" others so he can "connect" with them. His weapons of choice are steel wires he uses slice his targets to pieces.

A serial killer from death row. He kills to alleviate his boredom. He uses his incredible strength to crush objects into balls with his bare hands.

A former member of the Order who was banished for failing an important mission. He is very calm and analytical. His weapon of choice is a bladed, three-sectioned staff.

Media

Manga
Suzuki first published a one-shot titled  in Shueisha's Jump GIGA on December 26, 2019. Sakamoto Days debuted in Shueisha's shōnen manga magazine Weekly Shōnen Jump on November 21, 2020. Shueisha has collected its chapters into individual tankōbon volumes. The first volume was released on April 2, 2021. As of February 3, 2023, ten volumes have been released.

The series is simulpublished in English by Viz Media and the Manga Plus online platform. Viz Media will release its volumes in print, starting on April 5, 2022.

The series is licensed in Indonesia by Elex Media Komputindo.

Volume list

Chapters not yet in tankōbon format
These chapters have yet to be published in a tankōbon volume. They were originally serialized in Japanese in issues of Shueisha's magazine Weekly Shōnen Jump and its English digital version published by Viz Media and in Manga Plus by Shueisha.

Novel
In October 2022, it was announced that the series would receive a novel adaptation which will feature an exclusive story. It is set to be released in Q2 2023.

Reception
As of October 2022, the manga had 2.2 million copies in circulation. The series ranked 6th on the Nationwide Bookstore Employees' Recommended Comics of 2022. Manga author Hiromu Arakawa recommended the series with a comment featured on the obi of the 6th volume. Sakamoto Days was nominated for Best Print Manga at the 2021 Next Manga Awards. It placed 9th out of 50 nominees, but won the U-Next Prize. The series was nominated for the 68th Shogakukan Manga Award in the shōnen category in 2022.

References

Further reading

External links

Action anime and manga
Comedy anime and manga
Shōnen manga
Shueisha manga
Viz Media manga
Yakuza in anime and manga